Syeikh Abdullah Fahim bin Syeikh Ibrahim (1869 – 27 April 1961) was a Malaysian nationalist and religious scholar. He was Penang's first mufti after Independence. He was also the paternal grandfather of former Prime Minister of Malaysia, Abdullah Ahmad Badawi.

Abdullah Fahim known as “Pak Him” and “Chaiain” was born in Mecca, Saudi Arabia in 1869. He was a respected Islamic scholar and had set up and ran many religious schools, also known as madrasah or sekolah pondok. He was the mudir or director of Madrasah Idrisiah in Kuala Kangsar. He also started a madrasah in Kepala Batas, Prime Minister Abdullah Ahmad Badawi's current hometown. This was around the time he became Penang's first mufti. He died on April 26, 1961 in Kepala Batas, Kedah.

He was one of the key people who started Hisbul Muslimin, which later became known as Parti Islam Se-Malaysia or PAS, one of the main opposition parties in Malaysia which fights for an Islamist agenda. Both his son and grandson became leaders in UMNO, the sworn enemy of PAS.

Recently, on 12 February 2008, Abdullah Ahmad Badawi launched Universiti Kebangsaan Malaysia's newly set-up Islam Hadhari Institute's first Chair, which was named after Abdullah Fahim.

The Prime Minister in his speech said the Islam Hadhari Institute was the first of its kind in the country and he hoped that it would emerge as a leader in promoting Islam in and outside the country. On the Chair, named in honour of his grandfather's contribution and determination in fighting for the importance of development of Islam in Malaysia, the Prime Minister said he was deeply honoured.

References

Further reading
 Mesut Idriz and Syed Ali Tawfik al-Attas, THE IJAZAH OF ‛ABDULLAH FAHIM: A UNIQUE DOCUMENT FROM ISLAMIC EDUCATION (Kuala Lumpur: MPH Publishing, 2006)
 Case of three Abdullahs at launching of institute, The Star, 13 February 2008.
 Haji Abdullah Fahim
 Abdullah Fahim: The man who decided the Independence date, - Sunday, 29 July 2007.
 Sheikh Abdullah Fahim, - Tuesday, 22 July 2008
 Abdullah Fahim Penentu Tarikh Kemerdekaan Negara
 Haji ADBULLAH BIN HAJI IBRAHIM (SYEIKH ABDULLAH FAHIM)

People from Penang
Malaysian Muslims
Malaysian people of Yemeni descent
1869 births
1961 deaths